An Alu element is a short stretch of DNA originally characterized by the action of the Arthrobacter luteus (Alu) restriction endonuclease. Alu elements are the most abundant transposable elements, containing over one million copies dispersed throughout the human genome. Alu elements were thought to be selfish or parasitic DNA, because their sole known function is self reproduction. However, they are likely to play a role in evolution and have been used as genetic markers.  They are derived from the small cytoplasmic 7SL RNA, a component of the signal recognition particle. Alu elements are highly conserved within primate genomes and originated in the genome of an ancestor of Supraprimates.

Alu insertions have been implicated in several inherited human diseases and in various forms of cancer.

The study of Alu elements has also been important in elucidating human population genetics and the evolution of primates, including the evolution of humans.

Alu family 
The Alu family is a family of repetitive elements in primate genomes, including the human genome. Modern Alu elements are about 300 base pairs long and are therefore classified as short interspersed nuclear elements (SINEs) among the class of repetitive DNA elements. The typical structure is 5' - Part A - A5TACA6 - Part B - PolyA Tail - 3', where Part A and Part B (also known as "left arm" and "right arm") are similar nucleotide sequences.  Expressed another way, it is believed modern Alu elements emerged from a head to tail fusion of two distinct FAMs (fossil antique monomers) over 100 million years ago, hence its dimeric structure of two similar, but distinct monomers (left and right arms) joined by an A-rich linker. Both monomers are thought to have evolved from 7SL, also known as SRP RNA. The length of the polyA tail varies between Alu families.

There are over one million Alu elements interspersed throughout the human genome, and it is estimated that about 10.7% of the human genome consists of Alu sequences. However, less than 0.5% are polymorphic (i.e., occurring in more than one form or morph). In 1988, Jerzy Jurka and Temple Smith discovered that Alu elements were split in two major subfamilies known as AluJ (named after Jurka) and AluS (named after Smith), and other Alu subfamilies were also independently discovered by several groups. Later on, a sub-subfamily of AluS which included active Alu elements was given the separate name AluY. Dating back 65 million years, the AluJ lineage is the oldest and least active in the human genome. The younger AluS lineage is about 30 million years old and still contains some active elements. Finally, the AluY elements are the youngest of the three and have the greatest disposition to move along the human genome. The discovery of Alu subfamilies led to the hypothesis of master/source genes, and provided the definitive link between transposable elements (active elements) and interspersed repetitive DNA (mutated copies of active elements).

Related elements 
B1 elements in rats and mice are similar to Alus in that they also evolved from 7SL RNA, but they only have one left monomer arm. 95% percent of human Alus are also found in chimpanzees, and 50% of B elements in mice are also found in rats. These elements are mostly found in introns and upstream regulatory elements of genes.

The ancestral form of Alu and B1 is the fossil Alu monomer (FAM). Free-floating forms of the left and right arms exist, termed free left Alu monomers (FLAMs) and free right Alu monomers (FRAMs) respectively. A notable FLAM in primates is the BC200 lncRNA.

Sequence features

Two main promoter "boxes" are found in Alu: a 5' A box with the consensus , and a 3' B box with the consensus  (IUPAC nucleic acid notation). tRNAs, which are transcribed by RNA polymerase III, have a similar but stronger promoter structure. Both boxes are located in the left arm.

Alu elements contain four or fewer retinoic acid response element hexamer sites in its internal promoter, with the last one overlapping with the "B box". In this 7SL (SRP) RNA example below, functional hexamers are underlined using a solid line, with the non-functional third hexamer denoted using a dotted line:

.

The recognition sequence of the Alu I endonuclease is 5' ag/ct 3'; that is, the enzyme cuts the DNA segment between the guanine and cytosine residues (in lowercase above).

Alu elements

Alu elements are responsible for regulation of tissue-specific genes. They are also involved in the transcription of nearby genes and can sometimes change the way a gene is expressed.

Alu elements are retrotransposons and look like DNA copies made from RNA polymerase III-encoded RNAs. Alu elements do not encode for protein products. They are replicated as any other DNA sequence, but depend on LINE retrotransposons for generation of new elements.

Alu element replication and mobilization begins by interactions with signal recognition particles (SRPs), which aid newly translated proteins to reach their final destinations. Alu RNA forms a specific RNA:protein complex with a protein heterodimer consisting of SRP9 and SRP14. SRP9/14 facilitates Alu's attachment to ribosomes that capture nascent L1 proteins. Thus, an Alu element can take control of the L1 protein's reverse transcriptase, ensuring that the Alu's RNA sequence gets copied into the genome rather than the L1's mRNA.

Alu elements in primates form a fossil record that is relatively easy to decipher because Alu element insertion events have a characteristic signature that is both easy to read and faithfully recorded in the genome from generation to generation. The study of Alu Y elements (the more recently evolved) thus reveals details of ancestry because individuals will most likely only share a particular Alu element insertion if they have a common ancestor. This is because insertion of an Alu element occurs only 100 - 200 times per million years, and no known mechanism of deletion of one has been found. Therefore, individuals with an element likely descended from an ancestor with one—and vice versa, for those without. In genetics, the presence or lack thereof of a recently inserted Alu element may be a good property to consider when studying human evolution.

Most human Alu element insertions can be found in the corresponding positions in the genomes of other primates, but about 7,000 Alu insertions are unique to humans.

Impact in humans 

Alu elements have been proposed to affect gene expression and been found to contain functional promoter regions for steroid hormone receptors. Due to the abundant content of CpG dinucleotides found in Alu elements, these regions serve as a site of methylation, contributing to up to 30% of the methylation sites in the human genome. Alu elements are also a common source of mutations in humans; however, such mutations are often confined to non-coding regions of pre-mRNA (introns), where they have little discernible impact on the bearer. Mutations in the introns (or non-coding regions of RNA) have little or no effect on phenotype of an individual if the coding portion of individual's genome does not contain mutations. The Alu insertions that can be detrimental to the human body are inserted into coding regions (exons) or into mRNA after the process of splicing.

However, the variation generated can be used in studies of the movement and ancestry of human populations, and the mutagenic effect of Alu and retrotransposons in general has played a major role in the evolution of the human genome. There are also a number of cases where Alu insertions or deletions are associated with specific effects in humans:

Associations with human disease 
Alu insertions are sometimes disruptive and can result in inherited disorders. However, most Alu variation acts as markers that segregate with the disease so the presence of a particular Alu allele does not mean that the carrier will definitely get the disease.  The first report of Alu-mediated recombination causing a prevalent inherited predisposition to cancer was a 1995 report about hereditary nonpolyposis colorectal cancer. In the human genome, the most recently active have been the 22 AluY and 6 AluS Transposon Element subfamilies due to their inherited activity to cause various cancers. Thus due to their major heritable damage it is important to understand the causes that affect their transpositional activity.

The following human diseases have been linked with Alu insertions:
 Alport syndrome
 Breast cancer
 chorioretinal degeneration
 Diabetes mellitus type II
 Ewing's sarcoma
 Familial hypercholesterolemia
 Hemophilia
 Leigh syndrome
 mucopolysaccharidosis VII
 Neurofibromatosis
Macular degeneration

And the following diseases have been associated with single-nucleotide DNA variations in Alu elements affecting transcription levels:
Alzheimer's disease
 Lung cancer
 Gastric cancer

The following disease have been associated with repeat expansion of AAGGG pentamere in Alu element :
RFC1 mutation responsible of CANVAS (Cerebellar Ataxia, Neuropathy & Vestibular Areflexia Syndrome)

Associated human mutations 
 The ACE gene, encoding angiotensin-converting enzyme, has 2 common variants, one with an Alu insertion (ACE-I) and one with the Alu deleted (ACE-D). This variation has been linked to changes in sporting ability: the presence of the Alu element is associated with better performance in endurance-oriented events (e.g. triathlons), whereas its absence is associated with strength- and power-oriented performance.
 The opsin gene duplication which resulted in the re-gaining of trichromacy in Old World primates (including humans) is flanked by an Alu element, implicating the role of Alu in the evolution of three colour vision.

References

External links
 

Repetitive DNA sequences
Human genetics